Dr. Stephen Linton (born 1950) is a humanitarian and an expert on the Democratic People's Republic of Korea (North Korea). He has visited North Korea over 80 times since 1979 and twice met the country's late president, Kim Il-sung, as an advisor and translator to the Rev. Billy Graham.

He is also the founder and chairman of the Eugene Bell Foundation, which provides medical humanitarian assistance to rural North Korea. Focusing on multi-drug-resistant tuberculosis, the foundation currently sponsors 12 medical centers serving patients in half of the country.

Currently an affiliated scholar at Harvard University's Korea Institute, Linton was raised in a rural area of Jeollanam-do, South Korea, as the son of a prominent family of missionaries to Korea. His father, Hugh Linton, established over 200 churches in rural Korea and his mother, Betty Linton, served 40 years as director of the Soonchun Christian Tuberculosis Rehabilitation Center. His brother, John Linton, is the director of International Healthcare Center of Yonsei University in Seoul.

Education
BA (philosophy), Yonsei University, Westminster Theological Seminary,
MA Columbia University,
PhD Columbia University

External links 
 Eugene Bell Foundation
 Expert: North Korean Regime Study The Harvard Crimson October 31, 2006
 America's Korea Policy Needs an Overhaul Yale Global 2004
 Testimony Before the Senate Foreign Relations Committee, June 5, 2003 "Promoting Religious Freedom in North Korea", testimony before the US Commission on International Religious Freedom, January 24, 2002

1950 births
Harvard University staff
Living people
American expatriates in South Korea
People from South Jeolla Province